Dopesick may refer to:

 Dope sickness, the colloquial term for drug withdrawal
 Dopesick (album), by Eyehategod, 1996
 Dopesick, a 2018 book by Beth Macy
 Dopesick (miniseries), a 2021 Hulu TV series based on the book

See also
 Dope Sick, a 2012 album by Madchild